Roman Chychykalo (born 3 July 1992) is a Ukrainian handball player for Zagłębie Lubin and the Ukrainian national team.

He represented Ukraine at the 2020 European Men's Handball Championship.

References

1992 births
Living people
Ukrainian male handball players
Sportspeople from Odesa
Expatriate handball players
Expatriate handball players in Poland
Ukrainian expatriate sportspeople in Austria
Ukrainian expatriate sportspeople in Poland
21st-century Ukrainian people